The Pentecostal Oath was an oath which the Knights of King Arthur's Round Table swore, according to Sir Thomas Malory's Le Morte d'Arthur. It embodied the code of chivalry. In William Caxton's printed edition, this appears at the end of book five, chapter fifteen.

According to Malory's text (translated from the Winchester Manuscript):

References 

Oaths